Zwinderen is a village in the Netherlands and it is part of the Coevorden municipality in Drenthe, about 8.7 km from the city Coevorden.

Zwinderen is an esdorp without a church which developed in the early Middle Ages. It was first mentioned in 1217 as "in Suinre". The etymology is unclear. In 1840, it was home to 134 people.

References 

Coevorden
Populated places in Drenthe